Kultur im Gugg is a venue for contemporary art and culture in Braunau am Inn in Austria. The building was originally a fire-fighting equipment factory.

Theatres in Austria
Buildings and structures in Upper Austria